The Vanport Bridge is a four-lane continuous truss bridge that carries Interstate 376 (former Pennsylvania Route 60) across the Ohio River in Beaver County, Pennsylvania. A total of $10,476,268 was spent on construction of the 1,762-foot bridge over the Ohio River connecting Vanport and Potter townships, which was opened to traffic on December 23, 1968. As a vital part of the Beaver Valley Expressway it was carrying near 30,000 vehicles daily in 1990. In January 1990, bridge was closed for three days after corrosion and 14 cracks in welds ranging from 7 to 34 inches were discovered during routine PennDot inspection. Damage was located in the bottom truss plate holding the steel box beam in the central span. Passenger traffic was rerouted to the Rochester–Monaca Bridge; trucks — to the Shippingport Bridge. The Vanport Bridge was reopened after no imminent danger was found with repairs and clean-up scheduled.

See also
 
 
 
 List of crossings of the Ohio River

References

Continuous truss bridges in the United States
Bridges completed in 1968
Bridges over the Ohio River
Bridges in Beaver County, Pennsylvania
Road bridges in Pennsylvania
Bridges on the Interstate Highway System
Interstate 76 (Ohio–New Jersey)
Steel bridges in the United States
1968 establishments in Pennsylvania